The jack-knifefish (Equetus lanceolatus) is a species of fish in the family Sciaenidae, the drums and croakers. It is native to the western Atlantic Ocean, where its distribution extends along the eastern coasts of the Americas from the Carolinas in the United States to Brazil, including the Caribbean. Other common names include donkey fish and lance-shaped ribbonfish.

Description
This fish reaches about 25 centimeters in maximum length. The first dorsal fin is very tall. The body is gray in color with three brown or black bands. The first two bands are small and vertical, and the third extends from the tip of the tall dorsal fin down the body to the tip of the tail fin.

Habitat
This marine fish is mostly found along coasts in waters up to 60 meters deep, especially in reef habitat.

Biology
This species feeds on small invertebrates, and sometimes detritus.

Uses
This species is sometimes kept in marine aquaria. It can be bred in captivity.

Conservation
This species is not considered to be threatened. The aquarium trade does not significantly impact populations, even though it is valuable and easy to collect from the wild. It has a wide distribution, and in many areas it is a common species.

References

External links
 

Sciaenidae
Fish described in 1758
Taxa named by Carl Linnaeus
Fish of the Dominican Republic
Fish of the Atlantic Ocean